Keladi Kannmanii (also spelt Keladi Kanmani) is a 1990 Indian Tamil-language romantic drama film that marked the directorial debut of Vasanth. The film stars S. P. Balasubrahmanyam, Raadhika, Ramesh Aravind and Anju. It revolves around a terminally ill woman who seeks to make amends for a past mistake before she dies.

Producer A. Sundaram approached Vasanth to make a film for his production company, Vivek Chithra Productions, but Vasanth did not have a story. Ananthu created the story of Keladi Kannmanii, which Vasanth developed into a screenplay. Cinematography was handled by R. Raghunatha Reddy, editing was by the duo Ganesh–Kumar, and Maghi made his debut as art director.

Keladi Kannmanii was released on 27 July 1990 and became a commercial success, running for over 285 days at theatres. It won three Tamil Nadu State Film Awards (including Second Best Film) and Raadhika won the Filmfare Award for Best Actress – Tamil.

Plot 
Anu is a college student; her fellow student Sasi desperately tries to win her affection. Sasi and Anu play various pranks on each other. Anu eventually admits her affection for Sasi and they begin a courtship. All seems to be well, but Anu is strangely sad from time to time; she repeats to Sasi that she senses an imminent danger to their relationship, but she is unable to pinpoint what the threat is or describe why it may materialise soon.

Anu begins to get frequent sharp headaches. Her father, A. R. Rangaraj (ARR), a widower, tries to help her, but is not able to get to the bottom of the matter. ARR is a gentle old man who has devoted most of his life to his daughter. On her 18th birthday, Anu visits her doctor who determines that she has bilateral renal artery stenosis and is almost certain to succumb within a year. She may require an operation within that time, but the likelihood of her coming through it alive is minimal.

Anu asks the doctor to keep her illness a secret between them. Unknown to Anu, her father accidentally discovers it when the local pharmacist sends some prescription drugs through him. When Anu discusses the matter with Sasi, he expresses his support despite his grave sadness out of his love for her. Anu reveals a thread from her past that may explain her melancholic mood.

The film flashes back to several years before, when ARR had a happy family. Anu, then five or six, attended school; ARR worked and his wife managed the home. When ARR lost his wife to an illness, Anu took this particularly hard. ARR tried to help her cope with it and move on. Later, ARR met Sarada at a wedding. When ARR sought a tutor for Anu, Sarada took the position. The friendship evolved into a courtship, and ARR was about to propose marriage.

As time went on, Sarada realised her own responsibilities. Both her parents were deaf-mute, and she was the only way they could communicate with others; this left her torn between her filial duty and her personal aspirations. Things worsened when Anu missed her mother and was unable to accept Sarada (or anyone else) as a replacement. Sarada was bewildered and ultimately frustrated by all this. Despite ARR's assurances that they could work it out, she refused his proposal and decided to move to another city; her parents committed suicide as they felt they were a hindrance to their daughter. Since then, Anu has been plagued by guilt for her part in the breakup.

The doctors schedule the surgery. Anu takes this with stoic grief, and asks Sasi for one last thing: to find Sarada and attempt to reunite her with ARR. They find an old picture of Sarada, and Sasi recognises her as a woman he had met in Bangalore a few weeks ago. He sets off on a frantic hunt for Sarada. On the day of the operation, Sarada happens to be in Chennai en route to a training event in the United States. After a series of near-misses, Sasi locates her in the nick of time and brings her to Anu and ARR moments before Anu gets anaesthetised. Anu later goes for one last ride with Sasi on his motorbike and, right before they leave, she says that she has gained faith in surviving the surgery.

Cast 

 S. P. Balasubrahmanyam as A. R. Rangaraj (ARR)
 Raadhika as Sarada
 Ramesh Aravind as Sasi
 Anju as Anu
 Janagaraj  as Adaikkalam
 Poornam Viswanathan as Sarada's father
 Srividya as Sarada's mother
 Baby Neena as young Anu
 Charle as Sasi's friend
 Chinni Jayanth as Adaikkalam's friend
 Vivek as Adaikkalam's friend
 Krishnan as Mahadevan

 Geetha as Charulatha (ARR's wife)

Production

Development 
When film producer A. Sundaram approached Vasanth, an assistant to K. Balachander, to make a film for his production company, Vivek Chithra Productions, Vasanth was sceptical; he recalled, "Maybe he thought that just like how he was making [Pudhea Paadhai] with Bhagyaraj's assistant Parthiban at that time, he should make one with KB sir's assistant. I said I'd get back to him." Vasanth's family scolded him that he "should be thankful that I’m getting a producer without me getting a story ready and approaching many producers to produce it". Sundaram told him to return once he had a story ready.

Vasanth wanted to make films like his mentor Balachander, Mahendran and Balu Mahendra, so he decided to make one "that was mature for my age. So, a romance between two mature people was the starting point." The story was created by Ananthu, another assistant to Balachander, and Vasanth developed it into a screenplay. Keladi Kannmanii was Vasanth's directorial debut, and was named after the song of the same name from Balachander's Pudhu Pudhu Arthangal (1989). Cinematography was handled by R. Raghunatha Reddy, editing by the duo Ganesh–Kumar, and Maghi made his debut as art director.

Casting 
Vasanth approached S. P. Balasubrahmanyam to portray A. R. Rangaraj (ARR). The pair had earlier worked on Manathil Urudhi Vendum (1987), for which Vasanth was an assistant director. Vasanth was impressed with his realistic acting style and felt a "strong impression of him as a good actor, so we roped him in as an acting coup". Balasubrahmanyam was initially hesitant to accept the offer as he did not want Vasanth to take a risk by making a film with him as the lead actor. Vasanth remained firm with his selection because he wanted ARR "to be a character, which would not be possible with a popular face".

Suhasini was Vasanth's first choice for the role of Sarada, but she could not accept the offer due to her busy schedule; Raadhika was chosen instead. Ramesh Aravind was cast as Sasi because Vasanth worked with him in the Kannada film Sundara Swapnagalu (1986). According to Aravind, Vasanth approached him because the actor who was his original choice for the role could not accept. Sukanya and Ramya Krishnan were initial choices for the role of Anu, but could not accept due to other commitments; Anju was finally chosen by Vasanth, despite the scepticism of the crew since she was a relative newcomer. Neena played the character as a child after Vasanth saw her in Idhayathai Thirudathe, the Tamil-dubbed version of the Telugu film Geethanjali (1989).

Filming 
While scouting for filming locations, Vasanth came across an old house which was available for filming only for two days; he decided this would be the original house of Sarada. The first shot Vasanth directed was the scene where Sarada cries over the death of her parents. Before filming the scene, Raadhika asked for some time to prepare; she came much later and finished filming the scene in one take. Arvind's first scenes to be filmed were those with Raadhika; he had only three days to film those scenes as Raadhika was due to leave for London soon after. His other scenes, including those with Anju, were filmed after he worked on his call-sheet dates.

Due to Balasubrahmanyam's playback singing commitments, he could only shoot for two hours each day. The scooter that Balasubrahmanyam drove as ARR was a Bajaj Chetak. The song "Mannil Indha Kaadhal" was filmed at a beach off East Coast Road, Mahabalipuram.

Music 
The music was composed by Ilaiyaraaja, and the soundtrack album was released by Echo Records. Ilaiyaraaja was Vasanth's only choice for composing the music; despite his busy schedule, he accepted the offer. The song "Nee Pathi Naan Pathi" is set in Chakravakam, a Carnatic raga, and "Mannil Indha Kaadhal" is set in Keeravani. The song "Varanam Aayiram" is a ragamalika, a song set in multiple ragas; one stanza is set in Nayaki.

"Mannil Indha Kaadhal" was not originally planned to appear in the film. Vasanth wanted to showcase Balasubrahmanyam's singing prowess in a scene, but did not know how to do it. The idea of "breathless singing" eventually struck Vasanth; and Balasubrahmanyam agreed. The song has Balasubrahmanyam singing two stanzas seemingly without taking a single breath in between the lines. Vasanth initially proposed that the entire song be sung in one breath, but Ilaiyaraaja said to restrict that to specific stanzas. Balasubrahmanyam took 40 seconds to sing the second breathless stanza; he sang breathlessly for the first 25 seconds, and the last 15 seconds after briefly inhaling. It was then edited to look like he sang the entire stanza without taking breath.

When Ilaiyaraaja asked if the song "Karpoora Bommai Ondru" could be played in bits throughout the film, rather than all at once, Vasanth agreed because "it would be like something that haunts the characters, and make audiences expect for the moment when we would play it in its entirety". The entire soundtrack (except for "Mannil Indha Kaadhal") was completed in 45 minutes. Ilaiyaraaja took three days to compose the background music for the two reels forming the climax. For the Telugu-dubbed version O Papa Lali, all lyrics were written by Rajasri.

Release 
Keladi Kannmanii was released on 27 July 1990. The film was a commercial success, running for over 285 days in theatres, becoming a silver jubilee film. The success of the film enabled Ramesh Aravind to obtain roles in other Tamil films.

Critical reception 
N. Krishnaswamy of The Indian Express wrote, "Class photography by Raghunatha Reddy, brilliant decors created by debutant art director Maghi along with choice of new-look locales, rich music by [Ilaiyaraaja] and excellent staging of action by director Vasanth – even in his first film, this protégé of K. Balachander shows a great deal of competence – put Vivek Chitra's [Keladi Kannmanii] in the top bracket." Ananda Vikatan said that Vasanth had taken a weighty script in his first attempt and told it very clearly without any confusion for the audience, that he demonstrated self-confidence by choosing Balasubrahmanyam for the male lead and Anju for the role of his daughter, and that he made his guru (Balachander) proud with the film, rating it 55 out of 100.

Accolades

References

Bibliography

External links 

1990 directorial debut films
1990 films
1990 romantic drama films
1990s Tamil-language films
Films directed by Vasanth
Films scored by Ilaiyaraaja
Indian romantic drama films